Hyposmocoma eliai is a species of moth of the family Cosmopterigidae. It is endemic to Kauai. Larvae were collected on large barren volcanic rocks placed along the shoreline to reduce erosion in Nawiliwili bay.

The wingspan is 4.5–5.2 mm for males and 4.6–5.7 mm for females.

The larvae live in a larval case which has the form of a bag-shaped structure covered with minute particles of sand finely woven with silk.

Etymology
The species is named in honor of Elia Schmitz, three-year-old son of one of the authors.

References

eliai
Endemic moths of Hawaii
Moths described in 2011